Fresnes-sur-Marne (literally Fresnes on Marne) is a commune in the Seine-et-Marne department in the Île-de-France region in north-central France.

History
The Château de Fresnes was located here. On 12 January 1641 it was purchased by Henri de Guénégaud, who had the noted French architect François Mansart design and construct a chapel around 1644 to 1650. The château and chapel were demolished in 1828–1830.

Demographics
Inhabitants of Fresnes-sur-Marne are called Fresnois.

Notable people
 

Henri Buguet (1761–1833), historical and portrait painter

See also
Communes of the Seine-et-Marne department

References

External links

1999 Land Use, from IAURIF (Institute for Urban Planning and Development of the Paris-Île-de-France région) 

Communes of Seine-et-Marne